Park Yong-rae (Hangul: 박용래; Hanja: 朴龍來; August 14, 1925—November 21, 1980) was a South Korean poet.

Life
Park was born on August 14, 1925 in Buyeo, Chungcheongnam-do Korea and died November 21, 1980. He graduated from the Ganggyeong Commercial High School, and debuted his work in 1956 with the publication of “Song of Autumn”. Park worked as a bank employee and teacher and middle and high schools. Park died on November 21, 1980.

Works in Korean (selected)
 Snow Pellets (Ssaraknun, 1969)
 Foxtails (Gang-ajipul, 1975)
 Distant Sea (Meon Bada, 1984)

Awards
 Korean Literature Author's Award (1980)
 Contemporary Poetry Prize (1969)
 Chungnam Culture Award (1961)

See also
Korean Literature
List of Korean-language poets

References 

1925 births
South Korean male poets
1980 deaths